Elise Elsbeth Kroeber (November 28, 1882 Manhattan -1969) was an American Biology teacher for the New York Public School System who created a general biology curriculum for high school  known as "The Kroeber Curriculum".

Kroeber also co-authored the biology textbook "Adventures of Living Things" used in high school biology classes.  This text book was seen as a novel approach to biology when published in 1938.

Every year, the New York Biology Teachers Association awards the Elsbeth Kroeber Memorial Award to a graduating senior form the New York Public Schools.

Early life and career 
Kroeber was born on November 28, 1882 in Manhattan.

First a biology teacher, Kroeber retired in 1954 as Assistant Principal at Midwood High School in Brooklyn. However she continued her efforts in education for the next 10 years, serving as supervisor and board member for the Schools Volunteer Program of the Public Education Association, a tutoring program for the disadvantaged in New York City. She also developed and supervised in service courses to prepare teachers to become departmental chairs.

Elsbeth Kroeber Memorial Award Recipients 
 1972 - Karen Joy Shaw
 1973 - David Burton Grossberg
 1976 - Annette Stone
 1977 - Ellen Cutler, Patricia Manning
 1978 - Doreen Szczupiel
 1981 - Aaron P. Turkewitz
 1988 - Christine Ortiz, Sanya Tomsic

References

External links 
New York Biology Teachers Association

1882 births
1969 deaths
Schoolteachers from New York (state)
Science teachers
20th-century American women educators
20th-century American educators
Educators from New York City